Christophe Hérelle (born 22 August 1992) is a French professional footballer who plays as a defender for Brest.

Career
On 11 August 2020, Hérelle joined Ligue 1 side Brest on a four-year deal.

Personal life
Born in France, Hérelle is of Martiniquais descent.

References

External links

1992 births
Living people
French people of Martiniquais descent
French footballers
Footballers from Nice
Association football defenders
Ligue 1 players
Ligue 2 players
US Créteil-Lusitanos players
FC Sochaux-Montbéliard players
SR Colmar players
ES Troyes AC players
OGC Nice players
Stade Brestois 29 players